Andronymus evander, the ochreous dart, is a butterfly in the family Hesperiidae. It is found in Sierra Leone, Liberia, Ivory Coast, Ghana, Nigeria, Cameroon, Gabon, the Republic of the Congo, the Central African Republic and the Democratic Republic of the Congo. The habitat consists of forests.

Adults are found feeding on flowers at the edge of the forest.

References

Butterflies described in 1890
Erionotini
Butterflies of Africa